The following is a list of programs which have been or are soon to be broadcast on The CW Plus, a specialized programming service mainly available in media markets ranked above #100 by Nielsen, which provides a master schedule of network content from parent television network The CW and acquired programs distributed for syndication that fill time periods not allocated to network programming (some of which were originally acquired by predecessor service The WB 100+ Station Group, prior to the announcement of The CW's launch and the shutdowns of The WB and UPN).

Some programming may be pre-empted and replaced with alternate programming if another station in a certain market contracts to carry that program or are within the network's local news windows, and local deviations and programming from the master schedule are not noted here.

Current programming

Comedies
 Bob's Burgers (2015)
 Black-ish (2018)
 Family Guy (2015)

Dramas
 Chicago P.D. (2022)
 The Good Doctor (2022)

Reality/other

Former programming

Dramas

 Agents of S.H.I.E.L.D. (2016–17)
 The Border (2012–13)
 Burn Notice (2013-14)
 Cold Case (2009-11)
 Cold Squad (2006–11)
 Da Vinci's Inquest (2008-11)
 The Dead Zone (2007–09)
 Dead Like Me (2007-09)
 Dexter (2010-14)
 Elementary (2017–20)
 Farscape (2006–08)
 Heartland (2010–12, 2016–17)
 House (2010–12)
 Jeremiah (2007-08)
 Leverage (2012-13)
 The Listener (2019–20)
 MacGyver (2021-22)
 Masterminds (2006–07)
 The Mentalist (2011-14)
 Murdoch Mysteries (2014–15)
 The Outer Limits (2009–11)
 Psych (2010-20)
 Rookie Blue (2015–18)
 ReGenesis (2007–10)
 The Pinkertons (2014–15)
 Saving Hope (2017–19)
 True Blood (2012-14)
 The Shield (2006–08)
 Stone Undercover (2006–08)
 Stargate Atlantis (2010–11)
 Stargate SG-1 (2008–09)
 Stargate Universe (2010–11)
 Star Wars: The Clone Wars (2012–13) 
 White Collar (2014-19)

Comedies

Reality/other

Children's programming

See also
 List of programs broadcast by The CW
 List of programs broadcast by The WB 100+ Station Group

References

External links
 The CW Plus shows

 
CW Plus
Programs broadcast by The CW Plus